Corymbia papuana, commonly known as ghost gum, is a species of evergreen tree native to New Guinea, some Torres Strait Islands and the northern part of the Cape York Peninsula in Australia. It has smooth whitish bark, lance-shaped adult leaves, flower buds in groups of three or seven, creamy white flowers and barrel-shaped or urn-shaped fruit.

Description
It has smooth white, creamy white or pale grey bark. Flowering has been observed in October and November and the flowers are creamy white and perfumed.

Taxonomy and naming
This eucalypt was first formally described in 1875 by Ferdinand von Mueller who gave it the name Eucalyptus papuana. The description was published in von Mueller's book Descriptive notes on Papuan plants from specimens collected "[on] the mainland of new Guines opposite to Yule-Island, about twelve miles [19 km]) distant from the shores." In 1995, Ken Hill and Lawrie Johnson changed the name to Corymbia papuana.

Distribution and habitat
Corymbia papuana grows in grassy woodland usually on flats, but sometimes on stony hillsides. Hill and Johnson described the species as "endemic in southern parts of the island of New Guinea". Other authors include some Torres Strait Islands and northern parts of the Cape York Peninsula in the distribution.

References

papuana
Myrtales of Australia
Flora of Queensland
Flora of New Guinea
Plants described in 1875
Taxa named by Ferdinand von Mueller